A registered instrument is a form of property, such as shares or bonds, where records are kept of who owns the underlying property, or of the transactions involving transfer of ownership such as a company's share register. They may be contrasted with bearer instruments in which no records are kept of ownership or transfers.

In general, the legal situs of the property is the place that the register is located.

Securities (finance)